Hoshneh is a village in Gerdeh Rural District, in the Central District of Namin County, Ardabil Province, Iran. At the 2006 census, its population was 94, in 27 families.

References 

Towns and villages in Namin County